is the sixth single by Japanese actress and singer Maaya Sakamoto, released on October 21, 1999. The single belongs the Japanese anime series Cardcaptor Sakura, and is used in the opening credits sequence for its third and final season.

Track listing
 
 24
 Platinum (Instrumental)
 24 (Instrumental)

Charts

1999 singles
1999 songs
Maaya Sakamoto songs
Victor Entertainment singles
Anime songs
Songs with lyrics by Yuho Iwasato
Cardcaptor Sakura